Jazz Realities is an album by Carla Bley, Michael Mantler and Steve Lacy with Kent Carter and Aldo Romano. The album was released on the Fontana label in 1966.

Reception
The Allmusic review awarded the album 3 stars.

Track listing
All compositions by Carla Bley except as indicated
 "Doctor" - 7:45  
 "Oni Puladi" - 5:25
 "J.S." (Michael Mantler, Carla Bley) - 3:35   
 "Walking Batterie Woman" (Carla Bley, Michael Mantler) - 6:18  
 "Closer" - 5:30  
 "Communications No.7" (Michael Mantler) - 9:34
Recorded in Baarn, Holland on January 11, 1966.

Personnel
Carla Bley - piano
Michael Mantler - trumpet  
Steve Lacy - soprano saxophone  
Kent Carter - bass  
Aldo Romano - drums

References

1966 albums
Fontana Records albums
Carla Bley albums
Michael Mantler albums
Steve Lacy (saxophonist) albums